Lucy Bryan (born 22 May 1995 in Bristol) is an English athlete specialising in pole vault. She won a bronze medal at the 2017 European U23 Championships.

Her personal bests in the event are 4.50 metres outdoors (LSU, 2017) and 4.51 metres indoors (Akron 2018).

Personal life 

Lucy is the sister of Fulham's Joe Bryan.

International competitions

References

1995 births
Living people
English female pole vaulters
British female pole vaulters
Sportspeople from Bristol
Athletes (track and field) at the 2018 Commonwealth Games
Commonwealth Games competitors for England
Akron Zips track and field
Akron Zips women's track and field athletes